Mian Muhammad Shoaib Awaisi is a Pakistani politician who was a Member of the Provincial Assembly of the Punjab, from May 2013 to May 2018 and again from August 2018 till January 2023.

Early life and education
He was born on 6 August 1971 in Bahawalpur.

He has received intermediate level education from Govt. Sadiq Egerton College Bahawalpur.

Political career

He was elected to the Provincial Assembly of the Punjab as a candidate of Pakistan Muslim League (Nawaz) (PML-N) from Constituency PP-270 (Bahawalpur-IV) in 2013 Pakistani general election.

He was re-elected to Provincial Assembly of the Punjab as a candidate of PML-N from Constituency PP-252 (Bahawalpur-VIII) in 2018 Pakistani general election.

References

Living people
1971 births
Saraiki people
Pakistan Muslim League (N) MPAs (Punjab)
Punjab MPAs 2013–2018
Punjab MPAs 2018–2023